Madhav Manjunath Shanbhag (1873–17 January 1950) was an Indian lawyer and activist on behalf of the Konkani-speaking people. He was born in Karwar, Karnataka. With a few like-minded companions he travelled in all the Konkani-speaking areas, seeking to unite the fragmented Konkani community under the banner of 'one language, one script, one literature'. He succeeded in organizing the first Adhiveshan of All India Konkani Parishad in Karwar in 1939.

Legacy 
In 2007, Goa Konkani Akademi instituted Madhav Manjunath Shanbhag Konkani Bhasha Seva Puraskar, an award including a cash prize of Rs. 25,000. It is a lifetime achievement award for those over 50 years of age who have worked as an activist, leader, or organiser for the Konkani language. In 2009, J. B. Moraes won the award.

Further reading

References

20th-century Indian lawyers
People from Karwar